Nosey Parker is a 2003 film directed by John O'Brien.

Plot
Sick of suburbia, Natalie and Richard Newman move to rural Vermont, where they expect the unspoiled setting and intrinsic values to rejuvenate their marriage. Natalie wants to start a family; Richard, who has grown children from a first marriage, does not. As a compromise they build a trophy house. The construction of the dreamhouse inevitably leads to a visit from the local tax assessor (lister). Enter George Lyford, a lister and farmer, who over the course of two inspections, develops a flirtation with Natalie, which results in his becoming her handyman.

Cast
 Natalie Picoe as Natalie Newman
 George Lyford as George Lyford
 Richard Snee as Richard Newman

References

External links

2003 films
Films set in Vermont
2000s English-language films